Fakırca  is a village in Mut district of Mersin Province, Turkey. At , it is situated to the east of Göksu River and to the northwest of Mut. The population of the village was 423 as of 2012. The main economic activity of the village is agriculture.

References

Villages in Mut District